Akbari (also Romanized as Akbarī) is a village in Kushk-e Nar Rural District, Kushk-e Nar District, Parsian County, Hormozgan Province, Iran. At the 2006 census, its population was 172, in 24 families.

References 

Populated places in Parsian County